Ian Home Bowhill (1903–1975)  was a Scottish figure skater. He represented Great Britain at the 1928 Winter Olympics and placed 14th.

His wife, Elizabeth Bowhill, was an amateur golfer and was runner-up in the 1937 Scottish Women's Amateur Championship.

Competitive highlights

References 

1903 births
British male single skaters
Scottish male single skaters
1975 deaths
Olympic figure skaters of Great Britain
Sportspeople from Edinburgh
Figure skaters at the 1928 Winter Olympics